Jaylis Carolina Oliveros Toledo (born 13 November 1993) is a Venezuelan professional footballer who plays as a full back for Colombian club Atlético Huila and the Venezuela women's national team.

International career
Oliveros played for Venezuela at senior level in the 2014 Central American and Caribbean Games and the 2018 Copa América Femenina.

Personal life
Oliveros has dated fellow female footballer Yoreli Rincón.

References

External links

1993 births
Living people
People from Calabozo
Venezuelan women's footballers
Women's association football fullbacks
Deportivo Anzoátegui players
Atlético Huila footballers
Campeonato Brasileiro de Futebol Feminino Série A1 players
Venezuela women's international footballers
Competitors at the 2014 Central American and Caribbean Games
Venezuelan expatriate women's footballers
Venezuelan expatriate sportspeople in Colombia
Expatriate women's footballers in Colombia
Venezuelan expatriate sportspeople in Brazil
Expatriate women's footballers in Brazil
LGBT association football players
Venezuelan LGBT sportspeople